This article lists the colonial governors of Walvis Bay, a city in the modern day Republic of Namibia (currently the third largest city in the country). The list encompass the period from 1878 to 1994, when Walvis Bay and the surrounding territory (including the Penguin Islands) was controlled by the United Kingdom and later by South Africa.

The list also encompasses the period of joint Namibian-South African control of Walvis Bay, from 1993 to 1994.

The title of the position changed a number of times.  Under British rule, the title of the position went from Captain (1878) to Resident Magistrate (1878–1883) to Magistrate (1883–1910).  Under South African rule, the title was Magistrate (1910–1925), Magistrate and Chairman of Village Management Board (1925–1931) and Mayor (1931–1994).  Under joint Namibian-South African rule, the title was Chief Executive Officer of Joint Administrative Authority (1993–1994).

List

(Dates in italics indicate de facto continuation of office)

See also
Walvis Bay
Penguin Islands
South West Africa
List of colonial governors of South West Africa
Lists of office-holders

External links
World Statesmen – Namibia (Walvis Bay)

History of Namibia
South West Africa
Walvis Bay
Politics of South Africa
Colonial Walvis Bay